Harlequin is an area to the east of the Nottinghamshire village of Radcliffe on Trent in England, the two settlements separated by the A52 trunk road. It is contained within the Radcliffe on Trent parish, with Upper Saxondale to the east, and Radcliffe golf course and Dewberry Hill to the south.
Until the start of the 20th century there were several nurseries within Harlequin, which could account for its name, one theory being visitors to nearby Belvoir Castle saw the banked colours of glass houses and nursery flowers and likened them to patterns of a harlequin costume.

Two brick works businesses existed in the area until around 1940, along with several clay pits providing material.

The area contained little residential housing until 1940 onwards, much of the nurseries being sold to provide land. The area was notably once home to a Nottingham lace entrepreneur, George Mather.

References

External links
 Parish council

Villages in Nottinghamshire
Radcliffe on Trent